Ust-Kamchatsky District is an administrative and municipal district (raion) of Kamchatka Krai, Russia, one of the eleven in the krai. It is located in the east of the krai. Its administrative center is the rural locality (a settlement) of Ust-Kamchatsk. Population:  The population of Ust-Kamchatsk accounts for 37.1% of the district's total population.

References

Notes

Sources

Districts of Kamchatka Krai